The British League Division Two Riders Championship was a speedway contest between the top riders (or two riders) with the highest average points total from each club competing in the second tier of British speedway. The championship was inaugurated in 1968 when it was known as the British League Division Two Riders Championship.

The competition was known as the British League Division Two Riders' Championship between 1968 and 1974 and again between 1991 and 1994. From 1975 until 1990 it was known as the National League Riders' Championship. 

The competition was held at Hackney between 1968 and 1971, then it was moved to Wimbledon and held there between 1972 and 1984.  The last year of the tournament was 1994, after which speedway was restructured with the top two leagues combining to form the Premier League. After two seasons the Premier League became the second tier/division of British speedway in 1997, this resulted in the Premier League Riders Championship effectively being a continuation of the British League Division Two Riders Championship from 1997.

Winners

Sponsors
 Gauloises (1976)
 Toshiba (1980)

See also
List of United Kingdom Speedway League Riders' champions
Speedway in the United Kingdom

References

Speedway competitions in the United Kingdom